Buena Park Elementary School District is a public school district based in Orange County, California, United States. The small school district exclusively serves the city of Buena Park.

Schools
The school district has had two middle schools and five elementary schools since the 2020–21 school year. High school students are either directed to the Anaheim Union High School District or the Fullerton Joint Union High School District.

 Gordon H. Beatty Middle School
 Arthur F. Corey Elementary
 Charles G. Emery Elementary
 Carl E. Gilbert Elementary
 Mabel L. Pendleton Elementary
 James A. Whitaker Elementary
 Buena Park Middle School

References

External links
 

School districts in Orange County, California
Buena Park, California